Yang Jiao (born 7 September 1994) is a Chinese handball player. She plays for the club Liaoning Handball and on the Chinese national team. She represented China at the 2013 World Women's Handball Championship in Serbia, where the Chinese team placed 18th.

References

Chinese female handball players
1994 births
Living people
Handball players at the 2014 Asian Games
Handball players at the 2018 Asian Games
Asian Games silver medalists for China
Asian Games medalists in handball
Medalists at the 2018 Asian Games